Mark Gee (born 21 February 1972) is a British biathlete. He competed at the 1994 Winter Olympics, the 1998 Winter Olympics and the 2002 Winter Olympics.

References

External links
 

1972 births
Living people
British male biathletes
Olympic biathletes of Great Britain
Biathletes at the 1994 Winter Olympics
Biathletes at the 1998 Winter Olympics
Biathletes at the 2002 Winter Olympics
People from Badenoch and Strathspey